Tritonoturris macandrewi is a species of sea snail, a marine gastropod mollusk in the family Raphitomidae.

Description
The length of the shell varies between 14 mm and 24 mm

Distribution
This marine species occurs in the Persian Gulf, the Gulf of Oman and off the Philippines and in the China Seas.

References

 Liu, J.Y. [Ruiyu] (ed.). (2008). Checklist of marine biota of China seas. China Science Press. 1267 pp

External links
 Smith E.A. (1882). Diagnoses of new species of Pleurotomidae in the British Museum. Annals and Magazine of Natural History. ser. 5, 10: 296-306
 J.C. Melvill (1917), A revision of the Turridae (Pleurotomidae) occurring in the Persian Gulf, Gulf of Oman and North Arabian Sea, as evidenced mostly through the results of dredgings carried out by Mr. F. W. Townsend, 1893-1914;  Proceedings of the Malacological Society of London vol. 12, 1917  
 Li B.-Q. [Baoquan & Li X.-Z. [Xinzheng] (2014) Report on the Raphitomidae Bellardi, 1875 (Mollusca: Gastropoda: Conoidea) from the China Seas. Journal of Natural History 48(17-18): 999-1025]
 
 Gastropods.com: Tritonoturris macandrewi

macandrewi
Gastropods described in 1882